Kassapa Buddha (Pāli), is one of the ancient Buddhas whose biography is chronicled in chapter 24 of the Buddhavaṃsa, one of the books of the Pali Canon. He was the last Buddha before the "historical" Gautama Buddha, though living long before him.

According to Theravāda Buddhist tradition, Kassapa is the twenty-seventh of the twenty-nine named Buddhas, the sixth of the Seven Buddhas of Antiquity, and the third of the five Buddhas of the present kalpa.

The present kalpa is called a mahabhadrakalpa (great auspicious aeon). The five Buddhas of the present kalpa are:
Kakusandha (the first Buddha of the bhadrakalpa)
Koṇāgamana (the second Buddha of the bhadrakalpa)
Kassapa (the third Buddha of the bhadrakalpa)
Gautama (the fourth and present Buddha of the bhadrakalpa)
Maitreya (the fifth and future Buddha of the bhadrakalpa)

Life
Kassapa was born in Isipatana Deer Park. This place is located in Varanasi, a city in the modern-day state of Uttar Pradesh in northern India. His parents were the Brahmadatta and Dhanavatī.

According to legend, his body was twenty cubits high, and he lived for two thousand years in three different palaces. They are Hamsa, Yasa, and Sirinanda. (The BuA.217 calls the first two palaces Hamsavā and Yasavā). His chief wife was Sunandā, who bore him a son named Vijitasena.

Kassapa gave up his worldly life travelling in his palace. He practiced austerities for only seven days. Just before attaining enlightenment, he accepted a meal of milk-rice from his wife and grass for his seat from a yavapālaka named Soma. His Bodhi tree (the tree under which he attained enlightenment) was a banyan, and he preached his first sermon at Isipatana to an assembly of monks who had renounced the world in his company.

Kassapa performed the Twin Miracle at the foot of an asana tree outside Sundar Nagar. He held only one assembly of his disciples; among his most famous conversions was that of Nāradeva, a Yaksha. His chief disciples among monks were Tissa and Bhāradvāja, and among nuns were Anulā and Uruvelā, his attendant being Sabbamitta. Among his patrons, the most eminent were Sumangala and Ghattīkāra, Vijitasenā, and Bhaddā.

Kassapa died at the age of sixteen thousand years, in the city of Kashi, in the Kashi Kingdom (now known as Varanasi, in the modern-day Indian state of Uttar Pradesh). Over his relics was raised a stupa one league in height, each brick of which was worth one crore (ten million) rupees.

The Stupa of Kassapa Buddha
There was initially a great difference of opinion on what should be the size of the stupa and of what material it should be built. Construction of the stupa was begun after these issues were finally settled. But then the citizens found they lacked sufficient funds to complete the stupa. An anāgāmi devotee named Sorata travelled throughout Jambudvipa, requesting money from the people for the completion of the stupa. He sent the money as he received it, and on hearing that the work was completed, he set out to go and worship the stupa. However, he was seized by robbers and murdered in the forest, which later came to be known as the Andhavana.

Boudhanath stupa is said to be the stupa that was constructed enshrining the remains of Kassapa.

Upavāna, in a previous birth, became the guardian deity of the stupa, hence his great majesty in his last life (DA.ii.580; for another story of the building of the shrine see DhA.iii.29).

Among the thirty-seven goddesses noticed by Guttila when he visited heaven was one who had offered a scented five-spray at the stupa (J.ii.256). Alāta offered āneja-flowers and obtained a happy rebirth (J.vi.227).

The cause of Mahākāśyapa's golden complexion was his gift of a golden brick to the building of Kassapa's shrine (AA.i.116).

At the same stupa, Anuruddha, who was then a householder in Varanasi, offered butter and molasses in brass bowls, which were placed without any interval around the stupa (AA.i.105).

See also
Bhadrakalpikasutra

References

External links
Kassapa, der Pali Kanon des Theravāda-Buddhismus

Buddhas